Ottawa Fire Services (OFS) provides fire protection, technical rescue services, hazardous materials response, and first responder emergency medical assistance to the city of Ottawa, Ontario.

Organization

Like most North American fire departments, the Ottawa Fire Services is organized in a paramilitary fashion. The current Chief of the department is Paul Hutt. Serving under Hutt are three Deputy Chiefs, four Platoon Chiefs, five Division Chiefs, four Rural Sector Chiefs and twenty District Chiefs. At the station level, each urban station has a Captain for each of the four platoons. Each truck in the fleet is under the command of either a Captain or Lieutenant. For rural paid-on-call stations, each station has a station Captain and four Lieutenants.

History

The current Ottawa Fire Services came into existence in 2001 with the amalgamation of nine fire departments from Ottawa and the surrounding areas. The nine former departments include the Ottawa Fire Department, Gloucester Fire Department, Cumberland Fire Department, Kanata Fire Department, Nepean Fire Department, Osgoode Fire Department, Rideau Fire Department, Goulbourn Fire Department and West Carleton Fire Department.

Operations

There are 45 fire stations located across Ottawa, including 16 Paid On-Call stations and 5 composite stations. The stations are assigned to 9 district operations units. On Friday September 3, 2010, Chief deHooge announced that a three-year trial testing the use of 24-hour shift rotations would begin in January 2011. In Canada twelve of the fifteen largest fire departments are using the 24-hour shift rotation.

Equipment

Currently, City of Ottawa firefighters are issued tan Starfield Lion bunker gear, black leather Haix structural fire boots, and traditional black Cairns 1044 structural firefighting helmets for firefighters, red 1044s for Lieutenants and Captains and white 1044s for Chief Officers. In 2015, the department phased out their SCBAs (previously the ISI Viking), and replaced them with the MSA Firehawk M7XT with Rescue Belt II system and Ultra Elite facepiece.

Fire Stations and Apparatus

Apparatus Glossary 

 Pumper (P)
 Ladder (L)
 Tower (T)
 Rescue (R)
 Tanker (TA)
 Pumper/Tanker (PT)
 Hazardous materials unit (HM)
 Technical Rescue unit (TR)
 Squad (S)
 Service Vehicle (SV)
 Support Unit (SU)
 Brush Truck (BT)
 Water Rescue (WR)
 Air Management (AM)
 Rehab Vehicle (RHB)
 Brush Tanker (BTA)
 Pod Vehicle (PV)
 Safety Officer (SFTY)
 Officers Car (C)
 Fire Investigator (INV)
 Foam Truck (FT)
 Command Vehicle (CMD)
 Initial Hazard Assessment Team (IHAT)
 All-Terrain Vehicle (ATV)
 Snowmobile (SM)

Support Offices

Notable Incidents
The history of the Ottawa Fire Services includes several notable incidents, including the 1900 Hull–Ottawa fire.

See also

 Ottawa Paramedic Service
 Ottawa Police Service
 Ottawa By-law Services

References

 Ottawa Fire Services
 

Bibliography

Fire departments in Ontario
Municipal government of Ottawa